Phú Thọ station is a railway station in Vietnam. It serves the town of Phú Thọ, in Phú Thọ Province.

References

Buildings and structures in Phú Thọ province
Railway stations in Vietnam